Template:image label
 
 

Chunhua Town is a town in Changsha County, northeastern Hunan province, South Central China. Bordering towns are Lukou to the east, Lukou to the west, and Huanghua to the southwest; Chunhua also borders Yong'an and Shashi of Liuyang City.

References 

Divisions of Changsha County
Changsha County